WXMX (98.1 FM) is a commercial mainstream rock radio station near Memphis, Tennessee.  It is owned by Cumulus Media and is branded as "98-1 The Max".  The station's studios are located at the Memphis Radio Group building in East Memphis, and the transmitter site is in Cordova, Tennessee.

The station adopted its current format on April 1, 2005. For many years, the station aired the "Drake and Zeke" morning show. In 2015, Zeke Logan died and the show became known as "Drake in the Morning." The show lasted until 2020, when Drake Hall departed the station.

The new morning show was called "Danny and the Jar," featuring Dannie Burns and Chris Jarman. In December 2020, Jarman died.

References

External links

Drake in the Morning

Mainstream rock radio stations in the United States
XMX
Cumulus Media radio stations
Radio stations established in 1985
XMX
1985 establishments in Tennessee